The Story of Wenamun (alternately known as the Report of Wenamun, The Misadventures of Wenamun, Voyage of Unamūn, or [informally] as just Wenamun) is a literary text written in hieratic in the Late Egyptian language. It is only known from one incomplete copy discovered in 1890 at al-Hibah, Egypt, and subsequently purchased in 1891 in Cairo by the Russian Egyptologist Vladimir Goleniščev. It was found in a jar together with the Onomasticon of Amenope and the Tale of Woe.

The papyrus is now in the collection of the Pushkin Museum of Fine Arts, Moscow, and officially designated as Papyrus Pushkin 120. The hieratic text was published by Korostovcev 1960, and the hieroglyphic text was published by Gardiner 1932 (as well as on-line).

Discovery
The two-page papyrus is unprovenanced. It was reported to have been discovered in an illicit excavation at al-Hibah, Egypt, and was bought by Vladimir Golenishchev in 1891-92. Golenishchev published the manuscript in 1897-99.

The text

The story is set in an anonymous "Year 5", generally taken to be the fifth year of the so-called Renaissance of Pharaoh Ramesses XI, the tenth and last ruler of the Twentieth Dynasty of Ancient Egypt (1190 - 1077 BCE). However, since Karl Jansen-Winkeln has proposed to reverse the order of the High Priests of Amun Herihor and Piankh, this ascription has become disputed. With the pontificate of Herihor falling later than that of Piankh, who is attested in year 7 of the Renaissance, the date in the heading of Wenamun should rather refer to the direct (or indirect) successor of Ramesses XI. Following Jansen-Winkeln, Arno Egberts (1991) therefore argues that the story is set in the fifth regnal year of Smendes I, the Delta-based founder of the Twenty-first Dynasty. Recently, yet another solution has been suggested by Ad Thijs who ascribes the text to year 5 of "king" Pinedjem I, who is the successor of Ramesses XI in his radically alternative chronology, which is based on the reversal of High Priests put forward by Jansen-Winkeln.

As the story begins, the principal character, Wenamun, a priest of Amun at Karnak, is sent by the High Priest of Amun Herihor to the Phoenician city of Byblos to acquire lumber (probably cedar wood) to build a new ship to transport the cult image of Amun. After visiting Smendes (Nesbanebded in Egyptian) at Tanis, Wenamun stopped at the port of Dor ruled by the Tjeker prince Beder, where he was robbed. Upon reaching Byblos, he was shocked by the hostile reception he received there. When he finally gained an audience with Zakar-Baal, the local king, the latter refused to give the requested goods for free, as had been the traditional custom, instead demanding payment. Wenamun had to send to Smendes for payment, a humiliating move that demonstrates the waning of Egyptian power over the Eastern Mediterranean; a causative factor of a new nature can be seen in this ebbing of Egyptian power — the rise of Assyria and its intrusion into Phoenicia around the year 1100 BCE.

After a wait of almost a year at Byblos, Wenamun attempted to leave for Egypt, only to be blown off course to Alashiya (Cyprus), where he was almost killed by an angry mob before placing himself under the protection of the local queen, whom he called Hatbi. At this point the story breaks off.

Analysis

It was once widely believed that the Story of Wenamun was an actual historical account, written by Wenamun as a report regarding his travels. However, literary analysis conducted by Egyptologists since the 1980s (Helck 1986) indicates that it is a work of historical fiction, a view now generally accepted by most professionals working on the text. As Sass (2002) summarized the situation, "In recent years most Egyptologists have come to regard Wenamun 
as a work of fiction, composed after the events it relates, its value as a historical source rather limited (see also end of Section 4). On the other hand students of the Ancient Near East and of Egypto-Levantine connections, thirsting as they are after every scrap of written information, often still treat Wenamun practically as a primary historical source of the late 20th dynasty." As examples of the latter approach, Sass cites Mazar (1992), Kitchen (1996), Millard (1998), Yurco (1999), Ward (1999), Markoe (2000), Leahy (2001), and Weinstein (2001). For details on the former approach, see Baines 1999; Scheepers 1992; Egberts 2001; Sass 2002; Schipper 2005. Jaroslav Černý found that the text had no corrections, and was apparently written without any interruptions, such as would have been caused by simultaneously composing the document. In general, the literary character of the text is summed up by Egberts (2001:495) as being apparent from the sophisticated plot, the rhetoric and irony of the dialogues, the imagery, and the underlying reflection on political, theological, and cultural issues. Specific grammatical features also point to the literary nature of the text. Moreover, the palaeography of the text points to a Twenty-second Dynasty date for its composition (Caminos 1977:3; Helck 1986:1215), as well as a number of anachronisms more reflective of a post-Twentieth or Twenty-first Dynasty time frame (Sass 2002; Sass specifically states it was written during the reign of Shoshenq I). 

The text ends quite abruptly, possibly showing that the person writing the text down was only interested in the first part of the narrative, and stopped when he realized that he had continued too far into the return journey. However, it has also been suggested that the text as it stands is complete and nothing has been lost at the end, with the last words (And she said to me: "Be at rest") as a fitting, but hitherto unrecognized closing formula. Finally, at the end of the text, in a slightly larger hand, the syllable (copy) is written, showing that it is not the original, which of course limits the value of paleography as a means to date the content of the story. 

It would be naïve to assume that there have only been two copies of this narrative: a 20th Dynasty original and a 22nd Dynasty copy. The literary elements in the surviving text (such as the 'too good to be true timeframe' which was pointed out by Arno Egberts) suggest that in-between the events described and the apparent date of our surviving copy the story was somehow reworked to entertain a broader audience. From the fact that many of the main protagonists are not properly introduced, it seems clear that the 'report' became 'literature' at a time when most of the names and situations were still recognizable for an educated audience. A case in point is the ambiguous reference to "the messengers of Khaemwase who spent 17 years in this country and died in their positions " in lines 2, 51-53. Since this could theoretically refer to either Ramesses IX, Ramesses XI or the son of Ramses II, it seems that the editor of the text could expect his readers to know who was meant.

It is quite possible that the copy we have may date as much as one-hundred and fifty years later than the original.  The first reason for this assumption is that the post-script is used.  This is otherwise only used in the twenty-second dynasty (945-715 BCE).  The other reason is the locale where the document was discovered—the Upper Egyptian town of al-Hibah.  This town only gained any degree of importance under the reigns of Shoshenq I and Osorkon I.  There was also apparently a renewed interest in the affairs of the Levant during the twenty-second dynasty.

The author of Wenamun possibly wrote the original manuscript as an administrative document, a report of his journeys.  However, the man who had the document copied over a century later most likely had a different reason.  When theorizing about the purposes of the copyist, it seems to be all-too-common to forget about the reverse side of the papyrus.  This concerns, as near as we can tell, the "sending of commodities by Ni-ki.. through the agency of Ne-pz-K-r-t for unspecified payment."  It could be that this is a summarization of an attempt to perform a mission similar to that of Wenamun in this later time.  The Journey of Wenamun to Phoenicia, then, may have been copied as a preparation for this later trip.

Importance of the document
The Story of Wenamun is an unparalleled source of information on conditions in Egypt and Phoenicia.  The document, as no other of the period, reflects common attitudes toward religion (especially the cult of Amon), the state of Mediterranean shipping practices, and even the attitudes of foreign princes to Egyptian claims of supremacy in the region.  Even the supremacy of the pharaoh in Egypt comes into question; the current pharaoh, Ramesses XI, is never even mentioned during Wenamun's journey.  Thebes, Wenamun's hometown, is under the control of Herihor, High Priest of Amon.  

The authority whom Wenamun goes to see in the Nile Delta is Smendes, residing at Tanis, who bears the never-before-seen title "organizer-of-the-country".  Notably, neither Smendes nor Herihor bears any royal title whatsoever.  

The Story of Wenamun presents possibly the most vivid and descriptive narrative of pre-Classical times.  

Because the Story of Wenamun is based on a historical framework, it is particularly useful to historians studying the late New Kingdom and early Third Intermediate Period, who often treat the text as a primary source of the late 20th Dynasty.  

The Story of Wenamun was discovered together with another historical fiction, the so-called Tale of Woe (Papyrus Pushkin 127), which takes the form of an imaginary letter as a vehicle to convey a narrative.

The geography of Wenamun questioned 
Alessandra Nibbi, wrote a great number of articles in which she tried to show that many modern interpretations of geographical references in Ancient Egyptian texts are incorrect. On the basis of her analysis of the source texts, she concluded that Egypt was not a seafaring nation. Egyptian words normally connected to the Mediterranean (such as “the great ym of Kharu”) and the associated geographical names are reinterpreted. As a result of her investigations, she has had to "relocate" the places mentioned in Wenamun, assuming that Wenamun journeyed through the wadi Tumilat to lake Timsah. Although her conclusions have so far not been accepted by any major scholars, her work has led to a renewed study of certain terms.

References

Further reading 

Baines, John R. 1999. "On Wenamun as a Literary Text". In Literatur und Politik im pharaonischen und ptolemäischen Ägypten: Vorträge der Tagung zum Gedenken an Georges Posener 5.–10. September 1996 in Leipzig, edited by Jan Assmann, and Elke Blumenthal. Bibliothèque d'Étude 127. Cairo: Imprimerie de l'Institut français d'archéologie orientale du Caire. 209–233.
Caminos, Ricardo Augusto. 1977. A Tale of Woe from a Hieratic Papyrus in the A. S. Pushkin Museum of Fine Arts. Oxford: The Griffith Institute.
Černý, Jaroslav,. 1952.  Paper and books in Ancient Egypt. An inaugural lecture delivered at University College, London, 29 May 1947., London: H. K. Lewis.
Egberts, Arno. 1991. "The Chronology of The Report of Wenamun." Journal of Egyptian Archæology 77:57–67.
———. 1998. "Hard Times: The Chronology of 'The Report of Wenamun' Revised", Zeitschrift fur Ägyptischen Sprache 125 (1998), pp. 93–108.
———. 2001. "Wenamun". In The Oxford Encyclopedia of Ancient Egypt, edited by Donald Bruce Redford. Vol. 3 of 3 vols. Oxford, New York, and Cairo: Oxford University Press and The American University in Cairo Press. 495–496.
Eyre, C.J.  [1999] "Irony in the Story of Wenamun", in Assmann, J. & Blumenthal, E. (eds), Literatur und Politik im pharaonischen und ptolemäischen Ägypten, IFAO: le Caire, 1999, pp. 235–252.
Friedman, Florence. 1975. On the Meaning of W3ḏ-Wr in Selected Literary Texts, GM 17 (1975), 15-21
Gardiner, Alan Henderson. 1932. Late-Egyptian Stories. Bibliotheca aegyptiaca 1. Brussel: Fondation égyptologique reine Élisabeth. Contains the hieroglyphic text of the Story of Wenamun.
Goedicke, Hans. 1975. The Report of Wenamun. Baltimore: Johns Hopkins University Press.
Görg, Manfred. 1977. "Der Ekstatiker von Byblos", GM 23 (1977), 31-33.
Green, Michael. 1986. "m-k-m-r und w-r-k-t-r in der Wenamun-Geschichte", ZÄS 113 (1986), 115-119.
Helck, Hans Wolfgang. 1986. "Wenamun". In Lexikon der Ägyptologie, edited by Hans Wolfgang Helck and Wolfhart Westendorf. Vol. 6 of 7 vols. Wiesbaden: Otto Harrassowitz. 1215–1217
Kitchen, Kenneth A., 1996. The Third Intermediate Period in Egypt, 1100-650BC.  Warminster: Aris and Phillips, XVI-XVII.
Коростовцев, Михаил Александрович [Korostovcev, Mixail Aleksandrovič]. 1960. Путешествие Ун-Амуна в Библ Египетский иератический папирус №120 Государственного музея изобразительных искусств им. А. С. Пушкина в Москве. [Putešestvie Un-Amuna v Bibl: Egipetskij ieratičeskij papirus No. 120 Gosudarstvennogo muzeja izobrazitel'nyx iskusstv im. A. S. Puškina v Mockva.] Памятники литературы народов востока (Волъшая серия) 4. [Moscow]: Академия Наук СССР, Институт Востоковедения [Akademija Nauk SSSR, Institut Vostokovedenija].
Leahy, A. 2001. "Sea Peoples" in Oxford Encyclopedia of Ancient Egypt. Oxford, Vol. 3, 257–260.
Leprohon, R.J.  2004. "What Wenamun Could Have Bought: the Value of his Stolen Goods", Egypt, Israel, and the Ancient Mediterranean World: Studies in Honor of Donald B. Redford (ed. G.N. Knoppers and A. Hirsch; Probleme der Ägyptologie; Leiden: E. J. Brill, 2004)
Lorton, David. 1986. Where was Ancient Egypt's KPN(Y)?, Discussions in Egyptology 6 (1986), 89-99.
Markoe, Glenn E. 2000. Phoenicians.  London: British Museum Press.
Mazar, Amihay. 1992. Archaeology of the Land of the Bible, 10,000–586 B.C.E..  New York: Doubleday, 305-306.
Meltzer, Edmund S. 1987. "Wenamun 2,46", JSSEA 17 (1987), 86-88.
Millard, A. 1998 "Books in the Late Bronze Age in the Levant" in Israel Oriental Studies Vol 18 (Anson F. Rainey festschrift), 171–181.
Nibbi, Alessandra. 1975. YM and the Wadi Tumilat, GM 15 (1975), 35-38.
Nibbi, Alessandra. 1985. The Lebanon (sic) and DJAHY in the Egyptian texts, Discussions in Egyptology 1 (1985), 17-26.
Nibbi, Alessandra. 1988. Byblos (sic)and Wenamun: a reply to some recent unrealistic criticism, Discussions in Egyptology 11 (1988), 31-42.
Nibbi, Alessandra. 1992. Some Questions for M. Yoyotte, Discussions in Egyptology 24 (1992), 29-42.
Nibbi, Alessandra. 1994. Some remarks on the Cedar of Lebanon, Discussions in Egyptology 28 (1994), 35-52.
Nibbi, Alessandra. 1994. The Byblos question again, Discussions in Egyptology 30 (1994), 115-141.
Nibbi, Alessandra. 1996. The City of Dor and Wenamun, Discussions in Egyptology 35 (1996), 76-95.
Nibbi, Alessandra. 2002. Wenamun without Cyprus, Discussions in Egyptology 53 (2002), 71-74.
Sass, Benjamin. 2002. "Wenamun and His Levant—1075 BC or 925 BC?" Ägypten und Levante 12:247–255.
Scheepers, A. 1992. "Le voyage d'Ounamon: un texte 'littéraire' ou 'non-littéraire'?" In Amosiadès: Mélanges offerts au professeur Claude Vandersleyen par ses anciens étudiants, edited by Claude Obsomer and Ann-Laure Oosthoek. Louvain-la-neuve: [n. p.]. 355–365
Schipper, Bernd Ulrich. 2005. Die Erzählung des Wenamun: Ein Literaturwerk im Spannungsfeld von Politik, Geschichte und Religion. Orbis Biblicus et Orientalis 209. Freiburg and Göttingen: Universitätsverlag Freiburg and Vandenhoeck & Ruprecht. 
de Spens, Renaud. 1998. « Droit international et commerce au début de la XXIe dynastie. Analyse juridique du rapport d'Ounamon », in Le commerce en Egypte ancienne, éd. par N. Grimal et B. Menu (BdE 121), Le Caire, p. 105-126 at Thotweb.com.
Thijs, Ad. 2005. In Search of King Herihor and the Penultimate Ruler of the 20th Dynasty, ZÄS 132 (2005), 73-91.
Thijs, Ad. 2014. The Burial of Psusennes I and “The Bad Times” of P. Brooklyn 16.205, ZÄS 96 (2014), 209–223.
Ward, W.A., 1999. "Sea Peoples" in Encyclopedia of the Archaeology of Ancient Egypt, edited by K.A. Bard, New York, 718-721,843.
Weinstein, J. 2001. "Lebanon" in Oxford Encyclopedia of Ancient Egypt, Oxford, vol. 2, 284–286.
Winand, Jean. 2004. "L'ironie dans Ounamon: les emplois de mk et de ptr", GM 200 (2004), 105-110.
Winand, Jean. 2011. The Report of Wenanum. A Journey in Ancient Egyptian Literature
Yurco, Frank J, 1998. "Trade, Foreign" in Encyclopedia of the Archaeology of Ancient Egypt, edited by K.A. Bard, New York, 719-720.

External links 
The Report of Wenamun - Archaeowiki.org 
 Wenamen's Journey - dead link, lands at https://www.reshafim.org.il/http_new/index.asp?sitename=reshafim, the home page of a kibbutz. Wenamun's Journey is not on their current site map.
 Hieroglyphic transcription of the Story of Wenamun  archived on 2012-07-17

1890 archaeological discoveries
Story of Wenamun
Extra-biblical references to Canaan
Tourist attractions in Moscow
New Kingdom of Egypt
Third Intermediate Period of Egypt
Wadi Tumilat
Antiquities of the Pushkin Museum
Kings of Byblos